Fighter Ayşe (also known as Fightgirl or Fighter) is a 2007 drama action film directed by Natasha Arthy.

Plot
Ayşe is a young woman in Copenhagen whose parents want her to attend medical school because they wish for her a future with proper health insurance and entitlement to a pension. They also like to make sure she finds an appropriate husband.

She on the other hand considers her parents somewhat square and has her own plans. She is dedicated to Kung Fu. As a martial arts adept she receives recognition for doing something she enjoys.

Her family and her would-be in-laws resent her commitment for an exotic contact sport which regularly includes combat with men. All of them are worried about her neglecting school and getting a shady reputation.

When she falls in love with a young fighter named Emil the chances for her marriage with the man of her family's choice start to fade away.

Still her kin hasn't given in. There is Omar, a friend of the family, who is even more traditional than all the others, joins her club. He challenges her, intending to prove that her training is a waste of time. Ayşe has to stand up against him.

Cast
 Semra Turan as Ayşe Ahman
 Nima Nabipour as Ali Ahman
 Cyron Melville as Emil Andersen
 Molly Blixt Egelind as Sofie
 Sadi Tekelioglu as Ayşe's father
 Behruz Banissi as Omar Yüksel
 Xian Gao as Sifu
 Denize Karabuda as Ayşe's mother
 Ertugrul Yilan as Mehmet
 Özlem Saglanmak as Yasemin

Reception
The film received positive reviews.  It was especially appreciated for its handling of questions about cultural and personal identity   Semra Turan's performance was praised.

Accolades
Semra Turan was awarded as best actress at the 2008  Sitges Film Festival.

See also
Yasemin

References

External links

 
 
 

2007 films
Danish drama films
2007 drama films
Martial arts films
Nimbus Film films
2000s Danish-language films
2000s German-language films
2000s Turkish-language films
2007 multilingual films
Danish multilingual films